This is a list of awards and nominations received by Chinese actor and singer Chen Kun.

Film

Asian Film Awards

Beijing College Student Film Festival

Changchun Film Festival

Festival International du Film de Femmes de Salé

Golden Horse Film Festival and Awards

Golden Rooster Awards

Golden Phoenix Awards

Hong Kong Film Critics Society Award

Huabiao Awards

Huading Awards

Hundred Flowers Awards

International Chinese Film Festival

Shanghai Film Critics Awards

Shanghai International Film Festival

University Students' Film Festival

Television

China Television Arts Festival for "Top Ten Best"

Chunyan Awards

Shanghai Television Festival

Music

CCTV-MTV Music Awards

Channel[V] China Music Awards

China Music Chart Awards

ERC Chinese Top Ten Awards

MusicRadio China Top Chart Awards

Sprite China Original Music Chart Awards

Top Chinese Music Awards

References

Lists of awards received by Chinese actor
Lists of awards received by Chinese musician